Ken Berry (1933–2018) was an American actor, dancer, and singer.

Ken Berry or Kenneth Berry may also refer to:

 Kenneth Berry (British Free Corps) (1925–1992), member of the British Free Corps during World War II
 Ken Berry (baseball) (born 1941), American baseball player
 Ken Berry (ice hockey) (born 1960), Canadian ice hockey player
 Kenneth F. Berry (1916–2003), former member of the Ohio General Assembly